Brady Anthony Stewart is an American weightlifter. He was born on July 21, 1982 in St. Louis Missouri. Stewart is an 8-time US National Bench Press Team member for USA Powerlifting (Luxembourg 2009, Lithuania 2013, Sweden 2015, Denmark 2016, Lithuania 2017, South Africa 2018, Japan 2019, Czech Republic 2020[canceled due to Covid-19]). Stewart is the current American Record holder in the 120 kg / 264 lbs weight class with a press of 356.5 kg or 785.9 lbs.   Stewart is the only lifter in US history to have medaled in IPF OPEN World Equipped Bench Press Championship competition in the 264 lbs weight class.  He is also a member of the historic 2009 World Champion US National Bench Press Team.

Career 
Stewart has competed in powerlifting and bench pressing since 2000.  He has won eight US National Bench Press Championship Gold Medals.  He is the most decorated and dominant 120 kg / 264 lbs bench presser in the history of this sport in the United States.  He has earned 3 bronze medals, 1 silver medal, and 8 gold medals in national championship competition.  Brady is the only US athlete in his weight class to have medaled in OPEN World Championship Competition with a team Gold (TEAM USA) (Hamm, Luxembourg 2009), individual Silver placing (Rødby, Denmark 2016), and two individual Bronze placings (Kaunas, Lithuania 2017 and Tokyo, Japan 2019).  Stewart won the 2019 Arnold Sports Festival Pro Bench Championships with an historic lift of 372.5 kg / 821.2 lbs at a bodyweight of 124.89 kg / 275 lbs making it the All-Time Drug Tested Bench Press Record at 125 kg / 275 lbs weight class across federations (2 hour weigh in).  This lift narrowly edged out Blaine Sumner's historic 455 kg / 1003 lbs bench press by less than 1/2 of an IPF formula point.  Stewart is also a 3 time gold medalist in the North American Powerlifting Federation.  Earlier in Stewart's career, he was the American Record holder in the squat, bench press, and total in the 242 lbs weight class in the inaugural Arnold Classic Raw Powerlifting Championships.

McKendree University Sports Hall of Fame 
Stewart, 2004 graduate of McKendree University, was inducted into the Sports Hall of Fame on October 27, 2018 for his outstanding lifting career and dedication to coaching a new generation of strength athletes.

Coaching 
Stewart owns, operates, and coaches athletes at Zion Barbell in Carterville, Illinois.  In 2017 and 2018, his team won the Illinois State Powerlifting Championships.  Stewart has produced seven (drug free and drug tested) 600 lbs plus bench pressers and several others to over 500 lbs in USA Powerlifting utilizing his own methods.  Brady is also the first coach of the Southern Illinois University at Carbondale Powerlifting Team.  He has popularized concepts of training tolerance and readiness on his iTunes Podcast,  Berserker Strength Radio, with co-host Joshua Hunt.

All-Time World Bench Press Record 
Stewart's press of 372.5 kg / 821.2 lbs at a bodyweight of 124.89 kg / 275 lbs at the 2019 Arnold Sports Festival Pro Bench Championships is the "All-Time" World Bench Press Record Drug Tested with a 2 Hour weigh in.

American record history 

"FROZEN" 110 kg / 242 lbs USA American Bench Press Record History

280 kg (617.2 lbs) - 5/21/2011 - Illinois State Powerlifting Championships (Harrisburg, Illinois)

262.5 kg (578.7 lbs) - 3/1/2008 - Championships (Columbus, OH)

IPF World Bench Press Championship placings 

IPF World Championship Results

Competition history

Bench Press Only Raw and Equipped

Drug testing 
Stewart is a drug-tested athlete in the Athlete Location (ALF) Pool utilizing drug test protocols of the USADA and WADA. Stewart has never failed a drug test nor has ever been suspended as an athlete for any misconduct.

References 

American powerlifters
American strength athletes
Male powerlifters
McKendree University alumni
Sportspeople from Illinois
Sportspeople from Greater St. Louis
People from Lebanon, Illinois
People from Carterville, Illinois
21st-century Christians
1982 births
Living people